Robert "Zaza" Zirakishvili (born 13 March 1975) is a retired Georgian football striker. He became top goalscorer of the Erovnuli Liga in 2000–01 and also spent brief time in Portugal and Azerbaijan.

References

1975 births
Living people
Footballers from Georgia (country)
FC Dinamo Tbilisi players
FC Metalurgi Rustavi players
S.C. Farense players
FC Dinamo Batumi players
FC WIT Georgia players
FC Torpedo Kutaisi players
FC Lokomotivi Tbilisi players
Shamakhi FK players
FC Zestafoni players
FC Tbilisi players
FC Norchi Dinamo Tbilisi players
Primeira Liga players
Association football forwards
Expatriate footballers from Georgia (country)
Expatriate footballers in Portugal
Expatriate sportspeople from Georgia (country) in Portugal
Expatriate footballers in Azerbaijan
Expatriate sportspeople from Georgia (country) in Azerbaijan